Belozorovo is a rural locality (a selo) in Alexeyevsky District, Belgorod Oblast, Russia. The population was 199 as of 2010. There are 2 streets.

Geography 
Belozorovo is located 29 km south of Alexeyevka (the district's administrative centre) by road. Kovalevo is the nearest rural locality.

References 

Rural localities in Alexeyevsky District, Belgorod Oblast
Biryuchensky Uyezd